Yorman Polas Bartolo (born 8 August 1985) is a Cuban-German professional basketball player for Riesen Ludwigsburg of the Basketball Bundesliga.

He gained German citizenship in 2015, while he was playing for the Gießen 46ers in Germany.

In April 2018, Polas Bartolo was named the Best Defender of the 2017–18 BBL season. In the 2018–19 season, he won the award again. He signed with Riesen Ludwigsburg on 4 August 2020. On March 18, 2021, it was announced that Bartolo won the award for the third time.

National team career
He played for the Cuban national basketball team at the 2011 FIBA Americas Championship in  Mar del Plata, Argentina where he averaged 9 points and 4.5 rebounds per game.

References

External links
 FIBA Europe Cup Profile
 
 Eurobasket.com Profile

1985 births
Living people
Crailsheim Merlins players
Cuban expatriate basketball people
Cuban men's basketball players
Forwards (basketball)
German men's basketball players
German people of Cuban descent
Giessen 46ers players
Riesen Ludwigsburg players
Skyliners Frankfurt players
Sportspeople from Camagüey
Telekom Baskets Bonn players